Krystian Trochowski (born 10 November 1985) is a retired German international rugby union player, formerly playing for the Berliner RC in the Rugby-Bundesliga and the German national rugby union team.

He has played rugby since 1999.

His last game for Germany was a friendly against Switzerland on 29 September 2007.

Since 2011 he started a dj-career playing mostly local in Berlin. 
He played already at partys with acts like Westbam, Masomenos, Pier Bucci or Woody.

He is the cousin of German international footballer Piotr Trochowski.

Stats
Krystian Trochowski's personal statistics in club and international rugby:

Club

 As of 30 April 2012

National team

 As of 16 March 2010

References

External links
   Krystian Trochowski at totalrugby.de

1985 births
Living people
German rugby union players
Germany international rugby union players
Berliner RC players
Rugby union props
German people of Polish descent